Cryos International is a sperm and egg bank in Aarhus, Denmark. It was founded in 1987 by Ole Schou. The bank has an outpost in Florida in the United States. Both countries allow anonymity of donors. The bank delivers to more than 100 countries. Lesbian couples and single women made up 60% of clients as of September 2017 and sperm prices varied between €40 ($48) and €1,600.

References

External links
 Official website

 Sperm banks
Companies based in Aarhus
Danish companies established in 1987